Verus may refer to:

People
 Verus (gladiator) (fl. 80), Roman gladiator
 Verus (senator) (died 219), Roman centurion and senator
 Gnaeus Julius Verus (born c. 112), Roman general and senator
 Lucius Verus (130–169), Roman co-emperor with Marcus Aurelius
 Marcus Annius Verus (disambiguation)
 Marcus Annius Verus, birth name of Roman emperor Marcus Aurelius (121–180)
 Marcus Annius Verus (praetor) (died 124), Roman politician and father of Marcus Aurelius
 Marcus Annius Verus (grandfather of Marcus Aurelius) (died 138), Roman consul

Other uses
 Alex Verus, a series by Benedict Jacka

See also
 Ver (disambiguation)
 Vera (disambiguation)
 Vere (disambiguation)
 WER (disambiguation)
 Wehr (disambiguation)